The , is a Belgian breed of bantam chicken. It is a tailless variant of the Barbu d'Uccle, and was bred in about 1906 at the Château d'Everberg, at Everberg in the municipality of Kortenberg, between Brussels and Leuven. It is among the most endangered chicken breeds in Belgium, and in 2010 its conservation status was classed as "critical". It is a true bantam, with no large counterpart. Cocks weigh , and hens .

The Barbu d'Everberg is listed as a breed by the Entente Européenne. In Britain and in the Netherlands it is considered a variant of the Barbu d'Uccle rather than a separate breed.

References

Bantam chicken breeds
Chicken breeds originating in Belgium
Chicken breeds
Kortenberg